Mark Xhon Kastriot Marku (born 6 December 1991) is an insurance broker living in Switzerland. He rose to fame after taking part in the third season of Hrvatska traži zvijezdu, where he finished third overall.  Mark used this fame to start his business as an insurance broker, and later adding loans mediation as a service also.

Biography
Mark Xhon Kastriot Marku  was born on 6 December 1991 in Prizren, to a Catholic family of musicians. He grew up, finished his elementary and the Lorenc Antoni music high school in his hometown and moved to Zagreb, Croatia for his university studies. After a career in music where he gained fame by signing up for Hrvatska traži zvijezdu (Croatia searches a star), the Croatian version of Idols, Mark Marku pursued his career in becoming a broker, focusing on insurance and loans. In 2022, Marku became an independent insurance broker with a vast number of clients.

Marku opened a business called "Kredi dhe Sigurime ne Zvicer" offering a wide range of services to his clients. The company’s services include life, property, health and vehicle insurance as well as pension plans management. In addition, Mark Marku also offers services that help gain access to numerous types of loans.  The range of services offered by Marku reflects its specialization in managing the risks of organizations and individuals. Additionally, Marku provides risk assessment services so that clients can understand their financial situations better and make informed decisions about their insurance needs.

Mark is currently serving a wide array of clients, making sure that each client of his gets the best deal possible in terms of loans and insurance.

In his spare time, Mark continues to be involved in music. He is best known for his release "Da si htjela" (If you wanted), a successful single in Croatia, who was later brought to the Albanian-speaking territories as "Për ty" (For you).  

Mark Marku is currently married and has two kids. He resides in Zurich, Switzerland and is a devoted father and husband.

References

1991 births
Living people
Idols (franchise) participants
Kosovo Albanians
People from Prizren